Nereo Rocco (20 May 1912 – 20 February 1979) was an Italian association football player and manager. Regarded as one of the greatest managers of all time, he is famous for having been one of the most successful head coaches in Italy, winning several domestic and international titles during his tenure with A.C. Milan. At Padova, he was one of the first proponents of catenaccio in the country.

Playing career

Club

Rocco played as a winger in midfield; he had a modest playing career, spent mainly with Triestina, Napoli and Padova. He played 287 Serie A matches within 11 seasons, scoring 69 goals. Rocco was also capped one time for the Italy national team.

International
Rocco made an appearance for the Italy national team on one occasion: in Vittorio Pozzo's selection in the 1934 FIFA World Cup qualification match, on 25 March 1934 against Greece, a 4–0 home victory.

Coaching career

Triestina
Rocco made his coaching debut for Triestina in 1947. He obtained a surprising second place in Serie A, which is still the highest result ever reached by the team. He left Triestina a few years later because of disagreements with the club chairmanship. In 1951 he briefly coached Treviso, then returning to Triestina.

Padova
In 1953 Rocco signed as coach of Serie B team Padova, being able to avoid a relegation and obtaining promotion into Serie A the following season. The Serie A period of Rocco's Padova is still remembered as the team's most successful in their history, despite having a small team, they were able to take third place during the 1957–58 season. During his time with Padova, he also coached the Italian team at the 1960 Summer Olympics in Rome, alongside Giuseppe Viani, where they finished in fourth place.

A.C. Milan

In 1961, Rocco was appointed as new A.C. Milan coach, starting one of the most successful periods for the rossoneri: he built a hard-working and defensively sound side around the team's young star playmaker, Gianni Rivera, which complemented the midfielders' creative playing style; Rocco formed an important relationship with Rivera throughout his career, and together, they played a key role in the club's successes, winning the Italian league in 1962 and the European Cup in 1963. After a good stint at Torino, where he obtained the best results since the disappearance of the Grande Torino, in 1967 Rocco returned to Milan, where he immediately won another scudetto and the Cup Winners' Cup.

He left Milan in 1973, after having won also another European Cup in 1969, an Intercontinental Cup, two Italian Cups and another Cup Winners' Cup. After one year in Fiorentina, Rocco decided to end his coaching career in 1975. In 1977, he was appointed by Milan as Technical Director and Assistant of coach Nils Liedholm. Rocco is Milan's longest-serving manager, managing the club for 459 matches (323 as head coach and 136 as technical director).

Style of management

Regarded as one of the greatest managers of all time, Rocco was one of first proponents of catenaccio in Italy, and used the tactic to great success; drawing from Karl Rappan's tactics, his teams made use of a sweeper, who would sit behind the defensive line and clear the ball away, often using a 1–3–3–3 formation. His teams were known for their work-rate and physicality, as well as their simple but effective and pragmatic tactical strategies, namely their defensive strength, ability to counter–attack quickly with long balls, and score goals after winning back possession, rather than for being aesthetically pleasing to watch. During his time with Milan, he made use of Rivera as the team's playmaker in midfield, who took on the creative responsibilities of the team. He was known to be an excellent motivator, and developed strong personal relationships with his players in order to create a good team environment and foster a winning mentality, often discussing the team's tactics and the players man–marking roles over dinner rather than at a white–board during training sessions. In addition to his tactical intelligence, Rocco was also known for his charismatic personality, leadership, and sense of humour, despite his shy personality, and was known for being a very animated figures on the bench during matches. He also became popular for his quips, which he would often say to his players and journalists. Rocco, popularly known as El Paròn (Triestin for The Master), was also popular for his strong use of his native Triestine dialect.

Death and legacy
Rocco died on 20 February 1979, aged 66, in his hometown Trieste.

On 18 October 1992, a new stadium in Trieste, named after Rocco, was inaugurated.

Rocco's tactics heavily influenced manager Giovanni Trapattoni, who became one of the main proponents of the zona mista ("mixed zone," in Italian), or gioco all'italiana, which drew elements from both man-to-man marking systems such as Italian catenaccio, and zonal-marking systems such as Dutch total football.

Honours

Manager
A.C. Milan
 Serie A: 1961–62, 1967–68
 Coppa Italia: 1971–72, 1972–73, 1976–77
 European Cup: 1962–63, 1968–69
 UEFA Cup Winners' Cup: 1967–68, 1972–73
 Intercontinental Cup: 1969

Individual
 Seminatore d'Oro: 1962–63
 Italian Football Hall of Fame: 2012
 France Football 17th Greatest Manager of All Time: 2019
 World Soccer 36th Greatest Manager of All Time: 2013

References

1912 births
1979 deaths
Footballers from Trieste
Italian footballers
Italy international footballers
U.S. Triestina Calcio 1918 players
S.S.C. Napoli players
Calcio Padova players
Serie A players
Italian football managers
U.S. Triestina Calcio 1918 managers
Treviso F.B.C. 1993 managers
Calcio Padova managers
Torino F.C. managers
ACF Fiorentina managers
A.C. Milan managers
Serie A managers
UEFA Champions League winning managers
Association football midfielders